The Attorney General's Office (AGO) is a department of His Majesty's Government that supports the Attorney General and their deputy, the Solicitor General (together, the Law officers of the Crown in England and Wales). It is sometimes referred to as the Legal Secretariat to the Law Officers.

The administration and expenditure of the Attorney General's Office are scrutinised by the Justice Select Committee.

Organisation 

The AGO is one of the smallest UK government departments, with around 40 staff. It is one of "the Law Officers’ Departments" along with the Crown Prosecution Service (CPS) and HM Crown Prosecution Service Inspectorate (HMCPSI), the Serious Fraud Office (SFO) and the Government Legal Department. The Treasury Solicitor acts as Accounting Officer for the AGO.

The AGO provides legal advice and support to the Law Officers who themselves provide legal advice to the government, and works with the Ministry of Justice and the Home Office to develop criminal justice policy.

Ministers
The Law Officers in England and Wales are as follows:

See also
 Attorney General for England and Wales

References

External links

Ministerial departments of the Government of the United Kingdom
English law
1315 establishments in England